Teulisna divisa is a moth in the family Erebidae. It was described by Francis Walker in 1862. It is found on Borneo.

References
Citations

Sources

Moths described in 1862
divisa